Alberta Advanced Education (also known as the Ministry of Advanced Education) is a ministry in the Executive Council of Alberta. Alberta Advanced Education is responsible for the public funding of post-secondary institutions in the province, in addition to loans and grants for post-secondary students.

The ministry has existed in its current form since 2004.  However, two other ministries with the same title existed from 1971–1975 and 1983–1992.  On April 30, 2019, Demetrios Nicolaides was appointed Minister of Advanced Education following the 2019 Alberta general election, replacing Marlin Schmidt.

History

Alberta Advanced Education was founded on November 25, 2004 by an Order-in-Council, with Dave Hancock serving as inaugural minister. Alberta Advanced Education was created after the Ministry of Learning was split into the ministries of Education and Advanced Education.

Previously, the Advanced Education portfolio had changed hands across various ministries, including Advanced Education and Career Development (1992-1999) and Advanced Education and Manpower (1975-1983).

As of 2018, the ministry oversees institutions with a collective enrolment 263,495 students, with 17% of Albertans aged 17 to 34 enrolled in provincial post-secondary entities. Alberta Advanced Education's 2019 budget was $6,156,143,000, $5,700,030,000 (93%) of which was distributed directly to individual institutions.

Minister of Advanced Education

Provincial Institutions

Alberta Advanced Education divides public entities receiving funding into five groups in the ministry's annual report.

In addition, some independent institutions in the province receive funding from Alberta Advanced Education; these include Ambrose University, Burman University, Concordia University of Edmonton, St. Mary's University College, and The King's University College

See also

 Higher education in Alberta
 List of universities in Canada

References

External links
 Alberta Advanced Education
 Alberta Government Ministries

Alberta government departments and agencies
Education in Alberta
Subnational education ministries
2004 establishments in Canada